The 1982 Central Michigan Chippewas football team represented Central Michigan University in the Mid-American Conference (MAC) during the 1982 NCAA Division I-A football season. In their fifth season under head coach Herb Deromedi, the Chippewas compiled a 6–4–1 record (5–3–1 against MAC opponents), finished in a three-way tie for second place in the MAC standings, and outscored their opponents, 228 to 199. The team played its home games in Perry Shorts Stadium in Mount Pleasant, Michigan, with attendance of 139,653 in six home games.

The team's statistical leaders included quarterback Bob DeMarco with 1,113 passing yards, tailback Curtis Adams with 1,090 rushing yards, and Jaime Jackson with 412 receiving yards. Linebacker Ray Bentley received the team's most valuable player award. Three Central Michigan players (Adams, Bentley, and offensive guard Chris McKay) received first-team All-MAC honors.

Schedule

References

Central Michigan
Central Michigan Chippewas football seasons
Central Michigan Chippewas football